Kallang Single Member Constituency was a single member constituency (SMC) spanning Kallang of Singapore. It existed as Kallang Constituency from 1959 to 1988 then it was renamed as Kallang Single Member Constituency during political reform in 1988. The SMC lasted another term till 1991 when it was absorbed into Jalan Besar Group Representation Constituency.

Member of Parliament

Elections

Elections in 1950s

References

Subdivisions of Singapore
Kallang
Singaporean electoral divisions